Nikola Mikelini (born on 27 February 1982) is a Bosnian and Italian football manager and retired player.

Club career
Mikelini had a spell in the Austrian 5th and 4th tiers in 2013 and 2014.

International career
Mikelini made his debut for Bosnia and Herzegovina in a November 2008 friendly match against Slovenia. It remained his sole international appearance.

Honours

Player
Modrića
Bosnian Cup: 2003–04

References

External links

Player profile on Astra Ploieşti's Official Site

1982 births
Living people
People from Gračanica, Bosnia and Herzegovina
Association football central defenders
Bosnia and Herzegovina footballers
Bosnia and Herzegovina international footballers
Italian footballers
FK Modriča players
NK Žepče players
NK Čelik Zenica players
FK Sloboda Tuzla players
HNK Čapljina players
FC DAC 1904 Dunajská Streda players
FC Astra Giurgiu players
Atromitos Yeroskipou players
OFK Gradina players
FK Sloga Doboj players
FK Ozren Petrovo players
Premier League of Bosnia and Herzegovina players
Slovak Super Liga players
Liga II players
Cypriot Second Division players
Austrian Landesliga players
First League of the Republika Srpska players
Bosnia and Herzegovina expatriate footballers
Italian expatriate footballers
Expatriate footballers in Slovakia
Bosnia and Herzegovina expatriate sportspeople in Slovakia
Italian expatriate sportspeople in Slovakia
Expatriate footballers in Romania
Bosnia and Herzegovina expatriate sportspeople in Romania
Italian expatriate sportspeople in Romania
Expatriate footballers in Cyprus
Bosnia and Herzegovina expatriate sportspeople in Cyprus
Italian expatriate sportspeople in Cyprus
Expatriate footballers in Austria
Bosnia and Herzegovina expatriate sportspeople in Austria
Italian expatriate sportspeople in Austria
Bosnia and Herzegovina football managers
Italian football managers